The Laurence Olivier Award for Supporting Artist of the Year was a one-off award presented by the Society of London Theatre in recognition of achievements in commercial London theatre. The awards were established as the Society of West End Theatre Awards in 1976, and named in 1984 in honour of English actor and director Laurence Olivier.

This commingled actor/actress award, only ever presented at the 1976 inaugural awards, was presented to an actress.

Winners and nominees

1970s

See also
 Drama Desk Award for Outstanding Featured Actor in a Play
 Drama Desk Award for Outstanding Featured Actress in a Play
 Tony Award for Best Featured Actor in a Play
 Tony Award for Best Featured Actress in a Play

References

External links
 

Laurence Olivier Awards